HFA may stand for:

Arts and entertainment
 Harry Fox Agency, a provider of rights management for music publishers in the US
 High-fidelity audio, a quality of sound reproduction
 Honolulu Film Awards
 The High Fructose Adventures of Annoying Orange, a US television show

Chemistry
 Hexafluoroacetone, a colorless gas
 Hydrofluoroalkane, a refrigerant chosen to replace Freon-12

Schools
 Henry Ford Academy, a charter school in the US
 Holy Family Academy (Philippines), a Catholic educational institution in Angeles City
 Hume-Fogg High School, in Nashville, Tennessee, US

Other uses
 Haifa Airport, in Haifa, Israel (IATA code HFA)
 High-functioning alcoholic, a person that maintains jobs and relationships while exhibiting alcoholism
 High-functioning autism
 Hillary for America, the name of Hillary Rodham Clinton's campaign committee in the 2016 U.S. presidential election
 Humphrey field analyser, a tool for measuring the human visual field
 Hyogo Framework for Action, a United Nations ten-year plan for disaster resilience
 New York State Housing Finance Agency